The carunculated caracara (Phalcoboenus carunculatus) is a species of bird of prey in the family Falconidae, the falcons and caracaras. It is found in Colombia and Ecuador.

Taxonomy and systematics

The taxonomy of the caracaras has not been settled. The American Ornithological Society and the International Ornithological Committee place the carunculated and three other caracaras in genus Phalcoboenus. BirdLife International's Handbook of the Birds of the World also places the carunculated caracara in Phalcoboenus, and includes four other caracaras. The Clements taxonomy places the carunculated and six other caracaras in genus Daptrius.

The worldwide systems agree that the carunculated caracara is monotypic.

Description 

The sexes' plumages are alike. Adults are mostly glossy black with a bold pattern of white streaks on their breast. Their lower belly, undertail coverts, underside of the wing, and tips of the flight and tail feathers are pure unmarked white. Their cere and the bare skin on their face and throat are bright orange to deep red, and wrinkles ("caruncles") in the throat skin give the species its English name and specific epithet. Their iris is hazel to blackish gray and their legs and feet bright yellow. Juveniles are tawny to dark brown with some white mottling on the head, rump, and underparts. Their legs and feet are dusky.

Distribution and habitat

The carunculated caracara is found in the Andes from southwestern Colombia to southern Ecuador. It inhabits the temperate zone above treeline, where the landscape is páramo or grassy pastures with scattered bushes.

Behavior

Movement

As far as is known the carunculated caracara is a year-round resident, but is somewhat nomadic within its range, gathering in flocks that may number more than 100 outside the breeding season.

Feeding

The carunculated caracara is omnivorous and highly opportunistic. Its diet includes worms, insects and their larvae, other invertebrates, amphibians, small lizards and mammals, nestling birds, carrion, and vegetable matter like grain. It usually forages by walking or running on the ground but will do so in low-level flight. In often feeds in small groups among cattle or llamas.

Breeding

The carunculated caracara usually lays eggs during September and October, though there are records from later. It usually builds a stick nest on a cliff ledge but one has been recorded in a tree. The clutch size usually is two eggs. The incubation period, time to fledging, and details of parental care are not known.

Vocalization

As of early 2023, the Cornell Lab of Ornithology's Macaulay Library had only one recording of carunculated caracara flight calls. Xeno-canto had it and two other recordings. One is "grating and squealing barks" and the other a "long series of harsh notes".

Status

The IUCN has assessed the carunculated caracara as being of Least Concern. Though it has a restricted range and an estimated population of fewer than 6700 mature individuals, the latter is believed to be stable. No immediate threats have been identified. It is considered uncommon to locally common and "relatively secure at present, given that [its] habitat [is] not under significant pressure".

References

carunculated caracara
Birds of the Colombian Andes
Birds of the Ecuadorian Andes
Páramo fauna
carunculated caracara
Taxonomy articles created by Polbot